Oleh Ivanovych Tereshchenko (born 13 January 1972) is a former Ukrainian professional footballer.

Club career
He made his professional debut in the Soviet Second League in 1989 for FC Shakhtar Pavlohrad.

References

1972 births
Footballers from Dnipro
Living people
Soviet footballers
Association football midfielders
Association football defenders
Ukrainian footballers
Russian Premier League players
FC Tekstilshchik Kamyshin players
FC Elista players
FC Fakel Voronezh players
FC Sokol Saratov players
FC Volgar Astrakhan players
Oleh